MIES R.M. Law College is a private law college in Sonarpur, Kolkata, West Bengal. It was established in the year 2012. The college is affiliated to Vidyasagar University. This college is also approved by the Bar Council of India.

Courses 
The college offers three-years LL.B. course.

See also

References

External links 
 http://mies-lawcollege.com/index.php

Law schools in West Bengal
Universities and colleges in Kolkata
Colleges affiliated to Vidyasagar University
2012 establishments in West Bengal
Educational institutions established in 2012